Daydreaming is the second album by American R&B/pop singer Morris Day, released in 1987 on Warner Bros. Records. It is the follow-up to Day's debut album, Color of Success, featured are two collaborations with Day's former band, The Time minus Monte Moir.  One of these was the hit "Fishnet", which was produced with Time members Jimmy Jam and Terry Lewis.

Track listing

Personnel
Morris Day -  Lead and Backing Vocals, Keyboards, Percussion
Judith Day - Keyboards, Backing Vocals
Freeze - Keyboards, Bass, Synthesizer
Gregg Arrequin - Guitar
Roman Johnson - Keyboards
James Oppenheim (Boney James) - Percussion, saxophone on "Are You Ready"
Stephen Mitchell - Synthesizer
Alfie Silas, Maxavne Moriguchi, Sharon Robinson, Yolande Fischer - Backing Vocals

Jimmy Jam and Terry Lewis Produced tracks
Morris Day - Lead and Backing Vocals, Drums
Jimmy Jam - Keyboards, Backing Vocals
Terry Lewis - Bass, Backing Vocals
Jellybean Johnson - Backing Vocals
Jesse Johnson - Guitar, Backing Vocals
Jerome Benton - Backing Vocals

Charts

Album

Singles

External links 
 Morris Day-Daydreaming at Discogs

References

Morris Day albums
1987 albums
Warner Records albums
Albums produced by Jimmy Jam and Terry Lewis